Mils can refer to:
Mil, singular of Mils
Mils, a unit of angle based on the milliradian
Mils (artist), a French electronic band
Mils, Austria, a town in the district Innsbruck Land, Tyrol, Austria
Mils bei Imst, a municipality in the district of Imst, Tyrol, Austria
Multiple Independent Levels of Security, a high-assurance security architecture
Missile Impact Location System, an acoustic system to locate test missile nose cone impacts

See also
 Mil (disambiguation)
 Mill (disambiguation)